The Aspira F620 is a low-volume hand-built supercar.

The Aspira F620 is a one off handbuilt supercar. Engine choices are GM LS376/480 and LS9 supercharged V8 producing up to 800 bhp with mild tuning mated to a Graziano gearbox.

This UK/European compliant road car was UK road registered under a low volume production IVA status with a MACert achieved March 2010.

Built to exacting standards including aircon, leather seats and deluxe interior, electric mirrors, race logic launch and adjustable traction control, GEMS X25 ecu, hydraulic lift suspension, Varex exhaust and Aspira own big brake kit.

The total cost to produce this one off supercar is thought to be well over £250,000 and 3 years in the making. Produced using a combination of rapid  3d printing and traditional carbon fibre made parts the Aspira f620 prototype was produced by Craig Gillingham of Aspiracars Uk and Henry Nickless of Chiron world sportscars and was first shown at Autosport International, NEC, 2010.

As it remains a single produced vehicle, under low volume criteria such as used by the Koenigsegg CCR, the Aspira F620 has been described as the most exclusive supercar in the world today.

The car changed ownership on 8 March 2016 at auction in London, from its original owner.

External links
 Aspira Cars UK
 PistonHeads

Sports cars
Cars of England

References